The Falmouth Road Race is an annual  road race on Cape Cod from Woods Hole, a village in the town of Falmouth, Massachusetts, to Falmouth Heights.

The race organizer is Falmouth Road Race, Inc., a 501(c)(3) organization that puts on the race each year with proceeds to benefit local charities. It has its own logo as well. The race director is Dave McGillivray of DMSE Sports, Inc.

ASICS, an athletic footwear and apparel company, became the title sponsor of the race in 2021.

History

The race was the idea of Tommy Leonard, an avid runner and popular bartender in Boston and Falmouth. During the 1972 Summer Olympics, Leonard closed his bar in order to watch Frank Shorter win the first Olympic marathon for the United States since 1908.  After Shorter won the marathon Leonard was quoted as saying "Wouldn't it be fantastic if we could get Frank Shorter to run in a race on Cape Cod?"  One year later, in the summer of 1973, with the help of a local high school track coach John Carroll, and the town's recreation director Rich Sherman, the first Falmouth Road Race was run by approximately 100 people.  The next year there were 445 runners, and the year after that Frank Shorter joined 850 other runners in the race, bringing Leonard's wish true.  Today the ASICS Falmouth Road Race is considered one of the premier non-marathon races in the country, if not the world, attracting over 10,000 runners each year. The field of runners typically includes many of the best American and international runners, including both past and future Olympic athletes.

Entry
More people apply for places than can be accommodated in the race, so a random selection process is held to select the field of runners. The application period is a short window of time during the first half of May. Applications must be submitted online on the race website. A number of places are especially reserved for Falmouth residents. Five runners, celebrated through the years as "The Falmouth Five" Mike Bennett, Tom Brannelly, Don Delinks, Ron Pokraka and Brian Salzberg, have officially completed 46 consecutive Falmouth Road Races.

Course
The beginning of the course is extremely hilly, with a starting line by the Captain Kidd Restaurant & Bar in Woods Hole, and a finish by the Falmouth Heights beach. From the start corral, one races up a gradually steepening incline and into a narrow wooded road, emerging onto a long curved coastal stretch that runs by Nobska Light, continuing along a wooded road with gentle rolling hills, emerging onto Surf Drive along a hot beach on Martha's Vineyard Sound, past beach cottages on stilts, before turning inland toward the center of Falmouth town, along Falmouth Harbor, and finally looping back to the shore route for one last  hill that crests just before the finish.

Before 2006, promotional materials usually described the Falmouth Road Race as a  event. In 2006, it was measured and certified to be .

Winners

Key:

Wheelchair division
The race also has a wheelchair division with course records held by Daniel Romanchuck, USA, at 21:58 and Tatyana McFadden, USA, at 26:15, both set in 2019.

References

List of winners
 Monti, Dave (2009-08-10). Falmouth Road Race 7 miles. Association of Road Racing Statisticians. Retrieved on 2010-04-06.

External links
 Official website

Long-distance running competitions
Road running competitions in the United States
Recurring sporting events established in 1973
Sports competitions in Massachusetts
Annual sporting events in the United States
Sports in Barnstable County, Massachusetts
Falmouth, Massachusetts
1973 establishments in Massachusetts